Chittagong-8 is a constituency represented in the Jatiya Sangsad (National Parliament) of Bangladesh.

Boundaries 
The constituency encompasses Chittagong City Corporation wards 3 through 7, and all but one union parishad of Boalkhali Upazila: Sreepur Kharandwip.

History 
The constituency was created for the first general elections in newly independent Bangladesh, held in 1973.

Ahead of the 2008 general election, the Election Commission redrew constituency boundaries to reflect population changes revealed by the 2001 Bangladesh census. The 2008 redistricting altered the boundaries of the constituency.

Ahead of the 2014 general election, the Election Commission renumbered the seat for Chittagong-16 (Sandwip) to Chittagong-3, bumping up by one the suffix of the former constituency of that name and higher numbered constituencies in the district. Thus Chittagong-8 covers the area previously covered by Chittagong-7. Previously Chittagong-8 encompassed Chittagong City Corporation wards 15 through 23 and 31 through 35.

Members of Parliament

Elections

Elections in the 2010s 
Moin Uddin Khan Badal was elected unopposed in the 2014 general election after opposition parties withdrew their candidacies in a boycott of the election.

Elections in the 2000s

Elections in the 1990s 

Khaleda Zia stood for five seats in the 1991 general election: Bogra-7,  Dhaka-5, Dhaka-9, Feni-1, and Chittagong-8. After winning all five, she chose to represent Feni-1 and quit the other four, triggering by-elections in them. Amir Khasru Mahmud Chowdhury of the BNP was elected in a September 1991 by-election.

References

External links
 

Parliamentary constituencies in Bangladesh
Chittagong District